The Venad Express is an Express train connecting  and  via . The daily train's numbers are 16301 (from Shoranur Junction to Trivandrum Central) and 16302 (from Trivandrum Central to Shoranur Junction).

History 
The Venad Express is one of the oldest daily intercity trains in Kerala, and one of the most popular trains between Trivandrum (the state capital) and Ernakulam (Kochi). The Express was introduced in 1972 by Southern Railways. It travelled the  track between Trivandrum Central and Ernakulam. At that time, diesel engines were used to power the train, which initially had a green livery. In 1976, Indian Railways converted the tracks to broad gauge.

In the 1980s, Indian Railways introduced double-decker coaches for the train. The company later withdrew the double-decker compartments due to operational issues. The Venad Express was the fastest train of that time. Before its route extension, the train left  at 06:00 and reached  at 09:00. On the return trip, it left Ernakulam Junction/Cochin Harbour Terminus at 05:15 and reached Trivandrum Central by 09:30. Its rake was changed twice, first with a unique grey livery CBC rake which no other train in SR possessed. It was withdrawn from service after Venad got blue LHB coach. The train undergoes a locomotive reversal at Ernakulam Junction railway station.

Currently, the railways are planning to remove the stop at Ernakulam Junction. Instead, a longer halt was to be provided at Ernakulam Town. The train used to be hauled with diesel locomotives from Ernakulam locomotive shed. The diesel link was removed and it now runs with a WAP7 from Royapuram Shed.

Name 
The name Venad comes from the dynasty of Venad Swarupam, which ruled over Quilon (Kollam). The Trivandrum Division of Southern Railway Zone set a precedent on International Women's Day, March 8, 2020, when it ran the Venad Express with an all-female crew from Ernakulam Junction to Shoranur Junction. This was the first time in Kerala's history that an express train was operated by an all-female crew.

Frequency 
This Venad Express runs daily. Train number 16301 departs Shoranur Junction at 14:25 and reaches Trivandrum Central at 22:20. Train number 16302 departs from Trivandrum Central at 05:00 and reaches Shoranur Junction at 12:45. It covers a distance of 327 kilometers (203 mi.) in each direction, and takes 7 hours and 50 minutes to go from end to end.

The Venad Express links major commercial hubs within Kerala, including Thrissur, Aluva, Ernakulam, Kottayam, Chengannur, Kayamkulam, Kollam, Varkala, and Kochuveli with Trivandrum.

Coach composition 
The train's rake contains 16 unreserved coaches, 2 reserved coaches, an AC chair car coach, a pantry car and 2 EOG (End on Generation) coach cars for a total of 22 coaches. The train was allotted LHB coach starting in November 2019.

Advance reservation is available only in three compartments. Seats can be reserved through the IRCTC website or from the railway station. Other coaches can be boarded with an unreserved ticket.

Rake/Coach composition 

EOG – End on Generator

UR – Unreserved

D – Second Sitting

C – AC Chair Car

PC – Pantry Car

See also
Palaruvi Express
Rail transport in India
Vanchinad Express

References

Transport in Thiruvananthapuram
Named passenger trains of India
Rail transport in Kerala
Express trains in India